Valdir Henrique Barbosa da Silva (born 3 April 1998), known as Valdir, is a Brazilian professional footballer who plays as a forward for Austrian club Kapfenberger SV. He previously played in Brazil for Coruripe, Decisão, Linense and Mariunese and in Austria for SV Ried.

Career
Born in Maceió, Valdir played youth football for CSA before signing for Coruripe in December 2018, ahead of the 2019 season. He joined Decisão later in 2019 before a loan spell at Linense. He returned to Coruripe in 2020 before signing for Mariunese later that year. In summer 2021, he signed for Austrian Bundesliga club SV Ried on a two-year contract, alongside Maruinense teammate Reinaldo. On 28 January 2022, Valdir moved to Kapfenberger SV in the Austrian second tier on a 1.5-year contract.

Career statistics

References

1998 births
Living people
Brazilian footballers
People from Maceió
Association football forwards
Centro Sportivo Alagoano players
Associação Atlética Coruripe players
Sociedade Esportiva Decisão Futebol Clube players
Clube Atlético Linense players
SV Ried players
Kapfenberger SV players
Campeonato Brasileiro Série D players
Campeonato Pernambucano players
Austrian Football Bundesliga players
2. Liga (Austria) players
Brazilian expatriate footballers
Brazilian expatriate sportspeople in Austria
Expatriate footballers in Austria
Sportspeople from Alagoas